Kollam, also known by its former name Quilon , is an ancient seaport and city on the Malabar Coast of India bordering the Laccadive Sea, which is a part of the Arabian Sea. The city is on the banks of Ashtamudi Lake and the Kallada river.
It is the headquarters of the Kollam district. Kollam is the fourth largest city in Kerala and is known for cashew processing and coir manufacturing. It is the southern gateway to the Backwaters of Kerala and is a prominent tourist destination.

Kollam has a strong commercial reputation since ancient times. The Arabs, Phoenicians, Chinese, Ethiopians, Syrians, Jews, Chaldeans and Romans have all engaged in trade at the port of Kollam for millennia. As a result of Chinese trade, Kollam was mentioned by Ibn Battuta in the 14th century as one of the five Indian ports he had seen during the course of his twenty-four-year travels. Desinganadu's rajas exchanged embassies with Chinese rulers while there was a flourishing Chinese settlement at Kollam. In the ninth century, on his way to Canton, China, Persian merchant Sulaiman al-Tajir found Kollam to be the only port in India visited by huge Chinese junks. Marco Polo, the Venetian traveller, who was in Chinese service under Kublai Khan in 1275, visited Kollam and other towns on the west coast, in his capacity as a Chinese mandarin. Kollam is also home to one of the seven churches that were established by St Thomas as well as one of the 10 oldest mosques believed to be found by Malik Deenar in Kerala.

V. Nagam Aiya in his Travancore State Manual records that in 822 AD two East Syriac bishops Mar Sabor and Mar Proth, settled in Quilon with their followers. Two years later the Malabar Era began (824 AD) and Quilon became the premier city of the Malabar region ahead of Travancore and Cochin. Kollam Port was founded by Mar Sabor at Tangasseri in 825 as an alternative to reopening the inland seaport of Kore-ke-ni Kollam near Backare (Thevalakara), which was also known as Nelcynda and Tyndis to the Romans and Greeks and as Thondi to the Tamils.

Kollam city corporation received ISO 9001:2015 certification for municipal administration and services. As per the survey conducted by the Economist Intelligence Unit (EIU) based on urban area growth during January 2020, Kollam became the tenth fastest growing city in the world with a 31.1% urban growth between 2015 and 2020. It is a coastal city and on the banks of Ashtamudi Lake. The city hosts the administrative offices of Kollam district and is a prominent trading city for the state. The proportion of females to males in Kollam city is second highest among the 500 most populous cities in India. Kollam is one of the least polluted cities in India. 

During the later stages of the rule of the Chera monarchy in Kerala, Kollam emerged as the focal point of trade and politics. Kollam continues to be a major business and commercial centre in Kerala.  Four major trading centres around Kollam are Kottarakara, Punalur, Paravur, and Karunagapally. Kollam appeared as Palombe in Mandeville's Travels, where he claimed it contained a Fountain of Youth.

Etymology
In 825 CE, the Malayalam calendar, or Kollavarsham, was created in Kollam at meetings held in the city. The present Malayalam calendar is said to have begun with the re-founding of the town, which was rebuilt after its destruction by fire.

The city was known as Koolam in Arabic, Coulão in Portuguese, and Desinganadu in ancient Tamil literature.

History

As the ancient city of Quilon, Kollam was a flourishing port during the Pandya dynasty (c. 3rd century BC–12th century), and later became the capital of the independent Venad or the Kingdom of Quilon on its foundation in c. 825. Kollam was considered one of the four early entrepots in global sea trade during the 13th century, along with Alexandria and Cairo in Egypt, the Chinese city of Quanzhou, and Malacca in the Malaysian archipelago. It seems that trade at Kollam seems to have flourished right into the Medieval period as in 1280, there is instance of envoys of Yuan China coming to Kollam for establishing relations between the local ruler and China

Pandya rule
The ancient political and cultural history of Kollam was almost entirely independent from that of the rest of Kerala. The Chera dynasty governed the area of Malabar Coast between Alappuzha in the south to Kasaragod in the north. This included Palakkad Gap, Coimbatore, Salem, and Kolli Hills. The region around Coimbatore was ruled by the Cheras during Sangam period between c. first and the fourth centuries CE and it served as the eastern entrance to the Palakkad Gap, the principal trade route between the Malabar Coast and Tamil Nadu. However the southern region of present-day Kerala state (The coastal belt between Thiruvananthapuram and Alappuzha) was under Ay dynasty, who was more related to the Pandya dynasty of Madurai than Cheras.

Along with (Muziris and Tyndis), Quilon was an ancient seaport on the Malabar Coast of India from the early centuries before the Christian era. Kollam served as a major port city for Pandya dynasty on the western coast while Kulasekharapatnam served Pandyas on the eastern coast. The city had a high commercial reputation from the days of the Phoenicians and Ancient Romans. Pliny the Elder (23–79 AD) mentions Greek ships anchored at Muziris and Nelcynda. There was also a land route over the Western Ghats. Spices, pearls, diamonds, and silk were exported to Egypt and Rome from these ports. Pearls and diamonds came to the Chera Kingdom from Ceylon and the southeastern coast of India, then known as the Pandyan Kingdom.

Cosmas Indicopleustes, a Greek Nestorian sailor, in his book the Christian Topography who visited the Malabar Coast in 550, mentions an enclave of Christian believers in Male (Malabar Coast). He writes, "In the island of Tabropane (Ceylon), there is a church of Christians, and clerics and faithful. Likewise at Male, where the pepper grows, and in the farming community of Kalliana (Kalliankal at Nillackal) there is also a bishop consecrated in Persia in accordance with the Nicea Sunnahadose of 325 AD." The Nestorian Patriarch Jesujabus, who died in 660 AD, mentions Kollam in his letter to Simon, Metropolitan of Persia.

Kollam is also home to one of the oldest mosques in Indian subcontinent. According to the Legend of Cheraman Perumals, the first Indian mosque was built in 624 AD at Kodungallur with the mandate of the last the ruler (the Cheraman Perumal) of Chera dynasty, who left from Dharmadom to Mecca and converted to Islam during the lifetime of Prophet Muhammad (c. 570–632). According to Qissat Shakarwati Farmad, the Masjids at Kodungallur, Kollam, Madayi, Barkur, Mangalore, Kasaragod, Kannur, Dharmadam, Panthalayini, and Chaliyam, were built during the era of Malik Dinar, and they are among the oldest Masjids in Indian subcontinent. It is believed that Malik Dinar died at Thalangara in Kasaragod town.

Capital of Venad (9th to 12th centuries)

The port at Kollam, then known as Quilon, was founded in 825 by the Nestorian Christians Mar Sabor and Mar Proth with sanction from Ayyanadikal Thiruvadikal, the king of the independent Venad or the State of Quilon, a feudatory under the Chera kingdom.

It is believed that Mar Sapor Iso also proposed that the Chera king create a new seaport near Kollam in lieu of his request that he rebuild the almost vanished inland seaport at Kollam (kore-ke-ni) near Backare (Thevalakara), also known as Nelcynda and Tyndis to the Romans and Greeks and as Thondi to the Tamils, which had been without trade for several centuries because the Cheras were overrun by the Pallavas in the sixth century, ending the spice trade from the Malabar coast. This allowed the Nestorians to stay in the Chera kingdom for several decades and introduce the Christian faith among the Nampoothiri Vaishnavites and Nair sub-castes in the St. Thomas tradition, with the Syrian liturgy as a basis for the Doctrine of the Trinity, without replacing the Sanskrit and Vedic prayers. The Tharisapalli plates presented to Maruvan Sapor Iso by Ayyanadikal Thiruvadikal granted the Christians the privilege of overseeing foreign trade in the city as well as control over its weights and measures in a move designed to increase Quilon's trade and wealth. The two Christians were also instrumental in founding Christian churches with Syrian liturgy along the Malabar coast, distinct from the ancient Vedic Advaitam propounded by Adi Shankara in the early ninth century among the Nampoothiri Vaishnavites and Nair Sub Castes, as Malayalam was not accepted as a liturgical language until the early 18th century.

Thus began the Malayalam Era, known as Kolla Varsham after the city, indicating the importance of Kollam in the ninth century. The Persian merchant Soleyman of Siraf visited Malabar in the ninth century and found Quilon to be the only port in India used by the huge Chinese ships as their transshipment hub for goods on their way from China to the Persian Gulf. The rulers of Kollam (formerly called 'Desinganadu') had trade relations with China and exchanged embassies. According to the records of the Tang dynasty (618–913), Quilon was their chief port of call before the seventh century. The Chinese trade decreased about 600 and was again revived in the 13th century. Mirabilia Descripta by Bishop Catalani gives a description of life in Kollam, which he saw as the Catholic bishop-designate to Kollam, the oldest Catholic diocese in India. He also gives true and imaginary descriptions of life in 'India the Major' in the period before Marco Polo visited the city. Sulaiman al-Tajir, a Persian merchant who visited Kerala during the reign of Sthanu Ravi Varma (9th century CE), records that there was extensive trade between Kerala and China at that time, based at the port of Kollam.

Kollam as "Colombo" in the Catalan Atlas (1375)

In 13th century CE, Maravarman Kulasekara Pandyan I, a Pandya ruler fought a war in Venad and captured the city of Kollam. The city appears on the Catalan Atlas of 1375 CE as Columbo and Colobo. The map marks this city as a Christian city, ruled by a Christian ruler.

The text above the picture of the king says:

The city was much frequented by the Genoese merchants during the 13th-14th centuries CE, followed by the Dominican and Franciscan friars from Europe. The Genoese merchants called the city Colõbo/Colombo.

The city was founded in 825 by Maruvān Sapir Iso, a Persian East Syriac Christian merchant, and was also christianized early by the Saint Thomas Christians. In 1329 CE Pope John XXII established Kollam / Columbo as the first and only Roman Catholic bishopric on the Indian subcontinent, and appointed Jordan of Catalonia, a Dominican friar, as the diocese's first bishop of the Latin sect. The Pope's Latin scribes assigned the name "Columbum" to Columbo.

According to a book authored by Ilarius Augustus, published April, 2021 (Christopher Columbus: Buried deep in Latin the Indian origin of the great explorer from Genoa'), the words Columbum, Columbus and Columbo appear for the very first time in a notarial deed (lease contract) of a certain Mousso in Genoa in 1329 CE. These words appear in the form of a toponym. The author then shows, through the Latin text of several other notarial deeds and the documents on church history, how Christopher Columbus - also carrying the same toponym.- was part of Mousso's family, and hence of the Indian lineage (although born in Genoa).

Kozhikode Influences
The port at Kozhikode held superior economic and political position in medieval Kerala coast, while Kannur, Kollam, and Kochi, were commercially important secondary ports, where the traders from various parts of the world would gather.

Portuguese, Dutch and British Trade and Influences (16th to 18th centuries)

The Portuguese arrived at Kappad Kozhikode in 1498 during the Age of Discovery, thus opening a direct sea route from Europe to India. They were the first Europeans to establish a trading center in Tangasseri, Kollam in 1502, which became the centre of their trade in pepper. In the wars with the Moors/Arabs that followed, the ancient church (temple) of St Thomas Tradition at Thevalakara was destroyed. In 1517, the Portuguese built the St. Thomas Fort in Thangasseri, which was destroyed in the subsequent wars with the Dutch. In 1661, the Dutch East India Company took possession of the city. The remnants of the old Portuguese Fort, later renovated by the Dutch, can be found at Thangasseri. In the 18th century, Travancore conquered Kollam, followed by the British in 1795. Thangasseri remains today as an Anglo-Indian settlement, though few Anglo-Indians remain. The Infant Jesus Church in Thangasseri, an old Portuguese-built church, remains as a memento of the Portuguese rule of the area.

Battle of Quilon

The Battle of Quilon was fought in 1809 between a troop of the Indian kingdom of Travancore led by the then Dalawa (prime minister) of Travancore, Velu Thampi Dalawa and the British East India Company led by Colonel Chalmers at Cantonment Maidan in Quilon. The battle lasted for only six hours and was the result of the East India Company's invasion of Quilon and their garrison situated near the Cantonment Maidan. The company forces won the battle while all the insurrectionist who participated in the war were court-martialed and subsequently hanged at the maidan.

Travancore Rule
In the early 18th century CE, the Travancore royal family adopted some members from the royal family of Kolathunadu based at Kannur, and Parappanad based in present-day Malappuram district. Later, Venad Kingdom was completely merged with the Kingdom of Travancore during the rein of Marthanda Varma and Kollam remained as the capital of Travancore Kingdom. Later on, the capital of Travancore was relocated to Thiruvananthapuram.

Travancore became the most dominant state in Kerala by defeating the powerful Zamorin of Kozhikode in the battle of Purakkad in 1755. The Government Secretariat was also situated in Kollam till the 1830s. It was moved to Thiruvananthapuram during the reign of Swathi Thirunal.

Excavation at Kollam Port seabed
Excavations are going on at Kollam Port premises since February 2014 as the team has uncovered arrays of antique artifacts, including Chinese porcelain and coins. A Chinese team with the Palace Museum, a team from India with Kerala Council for Historical Research (KCHR) discovered Chinese coins and artifacts that show trade links between Kollam and ancient China.

Geography

Kollam city is bordered by the panchayats of Neendakara and Thrikkaruva to the north, Mayyanad to the south, and Thrikkovilvattom and Kottamkara to the east, and by the Laccadive Sea to the west. Ashtamudi Lake is in the heart of the city. The National Waterway 3 and Ithikkara river are two important waterways passing through the city. The Kallada river, another river that flows through the suburbs of the city, empties into Ashtamudi Lake, while the Ithikkara river runs to Paravur Kayal. Kattakayal, a freshwater lake in the city, connects another water-body named Vattakkayal with Lake Ashtamudi. In March 2016, IndiaTimes selected Kollam as one of the nine least polluted cities on earth to which anybody can relocate. Kollam is one among the top 10 most welcoming places in India for the year 2020, according to Booking.com's traveller review awards.

Kollam is an ancient trading town – trading with Romans, Chinese, Arabs, and other Orientals – mentioned in historical citations dating back to Biblical times and the reign of Solomon, connecting with Red Sea ports of the Arabian Sea (supported by a find of ancient Roman coins). There was also internal trade through the Aryankavu Pass in Schenkottah Gap connecting the ancient town to Tamil Nadu. The overland trade in pepper by bullock cart and the trade over the waterways connecting Allepey and Cochin established trade linkages that enabled it to grow into one of the earliest Indian industrial townships. The rail links later established to Tamil Nadu supported still stronger trade links. The factories processing marine exports and the processing and packaging of cashewnuts extended its trade across the globe. It is known for cashew processing and coir manufacturing. Ashtamudi Lake is considered the southern gateway to the backwaters of Kerala and is a prominent tourist destination at Kollam. The Kollam urban area includes suburban towns such as Paravur in the south, Kundara in the east and Karunagapally in the north of the city. Other important towns in the city suburbs are Eravipuram, Kottiyam, Kannanallur, and Chavara.

Climate
Kollam experiences a tropical monsoon climate (Köppen Am) with little seasonal variation in temperatures. April to November is the wet season, with considerably more rain than during December to March, especially in June and July at the height of the Southwest Monsoon.

Demographics

 Population 
 India census, Kollam city had a population of 349,033 with a density of 5,400 persons per square kilometre. The sex ratio (the number of females per 1,000 males) was 1,112, the highest in the state. The district of Kollam ranked seventh in population in the state while the city of Kollam ranked fourth.  Kollam had an average literacy rate of 93.77%, higher than the national average of 74.04%. Male literacy stood at 95.83%, and female at 91.95%. In Kollam, 11% of the population was under six years of age. In May 2015, Government of Kerala have decided to expand City Corporation of Kollam by merging Thrikkadavoor panchayath. So the area will become  with a total city population of 384,892.
Malayalam is the most widely spoken language and official language of the city, while Tamil is understood by some sections in the city. There are also small communities of Anglo-Indians, Konkani Brahmins, Telugu Chetty and Bengali	migrant labourers settled in the city. For ease of administration, Kollam Municipal Corporation is divided into six zones with local zonal offices for each one.

 Central Zone (headquartered at Cantonment), Kollam Municipal Corporation
 Sakthikulangara Zone, Kollam Municipal Corporation
 Vadakkevila Zone, Kollam Municipal Corporation
 Kilikollur Zone, Kollam Municipal Corporation
 Eravipuram Zone, Kollam Municipal Corporation
 Thrikkadavoor Zone, Kollam Municipal Corporation

In 2014, former Kollam Mayor Mrs. Prasanna Earnest was selected as the Best Lady Mayor of South India by the Rotary Club of Trivandrum Royal

 Religion 

The city of Kollam is a microcosm of Kerala state with its residents belonging to varied religious, ethnic and linguistic groups. There are so many ancient temples, centuries-old churches and mosques in the city and its suburbs. Kollam is a Hindu majority city in Kerala. 56.35% of Kollam's total population belongs to Hindu community. Moreover, the Kollam Era (also known as Malayalam Era or Kollavarsham or Malayalam Calendar or Malabar Era), solar and sidereal Hindu calendar used in Kerala, has been originated on 825 CE (Pothu Varsham) at (Kollam) city. 

Muslims account for 22.05% of Kollam's total population. As per the Census 2011 data, 80,935 is the total Muslim population in Kollam. The Karbala Maidan and the adjacent Makani mosque serves as the Eid gah for the city. The 300-year-old Juma-'Ath Palli at Karuva houses the mortal remains of a Sufi saint, Syed Abdur Rahman Jifri.

Christians account for 21.17% of the total population of Kollam city. The Roman Catholic Diocese of Quilon (Kollam) is the first Catholic diocese in India. The diocese was first erected by Pope John XXII on 9 August 1329. It was re-erected on 1 September 1886. The famous Infant Jesus Cathedral, 400 years old, located in Thangassery, is the co-cathedral of the Roman Catholic Diocese of Quilon. CSI Kollam-Kottarakara Diocese is one of the twenty-four dioceses of the Church of South India. The Headquarters of the Kerala region of The Pentecostal Mission for Kottarakkara, is in Kollam.

Civic administration

Kollam City is a Municipal Corporation with elected Councillors from its 55 divisions. The Mayor, elected from among the councillors, generally represents the political party holding a majority. The Corporation Secretary heads the office of the corporation. The present Mayor of Kollam Corporation is Adv.V. Rajendrababu of CPI(M).
The police administration of the city falls under the Kollam City Police Commissionerate which is headed by an IPS (Indian Police Service) cadre officer and he reports to the Inspector General of Police (IGP) Thiruvananthapuram Range. The police administration comes under the State Home Department of the Government of Kerala. Kollam City is divided into three subdivisions, Karunagappally, Kollam and Chathannoor, each under an Assistant Commissioner of Police.

Urban structure

With a total urban population of 1,187,158 and 349,033 as city corporation's population, Kollam is the fourth most populous city in the state and 49th on the list of the most populous urban agglomerations in India.   the city's urban growth rate of 154.59% was the second highest in the state. The Metropolitan area of Kollam includes Uliyakovil, Adichanalloor, Adinad, Ayanivelikulangara, Chavara, Elampalloor, Eravipuram (Part), Kallelibhagom, Karunagappally, Kollam, Kottamkara, Kulasekharapuram, Mayyanad, Meenad, Nedumpana, Neendakara, Oachira, Panayam, Panmana, Paravur, Perinad, Poothakkulam, Thazhuthala, Thodiyoor, Thrikkadavoor, Thrikkaruva, Thrikkovilvattom, and Vadakkumthala.

The Kerala Government has decided to develop the City of Kollam as a "Port City of Kerala". Regeneration of the Maruthadi-Eravipuram area including construction of facilities for fishing, tourism and entertainment projects will be implemented as part of the project

Economy
The city life of Kollam has changed in the last decade. In terms of economic performance and per capita income, Kollam city is in fifth position from India and third in Kerala. Kollam is famous as a city with excellent export background. 5 star, 4 star and 3 star hotels, multi-storied shopping malls, branded jewellery, textile showrooms and car showrooms have started operations in the city and suburbs. Kollam was the third city in Kerala (after Kozhikode and Kochi) to adopt the shopping mall culture. Kollam district ranks first in livestock wealth in the state. Downtown Kollam is the main CBD of Kollam city.right|thumb|A large Chinese fishing net at Ashtamudi Lake in Kollam city
Dairy farming is fairly well developed. Also there is a chilling plant in the city. Kollam is an important maritime and port city. Fishing has a place in the economy of the district. Neendakara and Sakthikulangara villages in the suburbs of the city have fisheries. An estimated 134,973 persons are engaged in fishing and allied activities. Cheriazheekkal, Alappad, Pandarathuruthu, Puthenthura, Neendakara, Thangasseri, Eravipuram and Paravur are eight of the 26 important fishing villages. There are 24 inland fishing villages. The Government has initiated steps for establishing a fishing harbour at Neendakara. Average fish landing is estimated at 85,275 tonnes per year. One-third of the state's fish catch is from Kollam. Nearly 3000 mechanised boats are operating from the fishing harbour. FFDA and VFFDA promote fresh water fish culture and prawn farming respectively. A fishing village with 100 houses is being built at Eravipuram. A prawn farm is being built at Ayiramthengu, and several new hatcheries are planned to cater to the needs of the aquaculturists. Kerala's only turkey farm and a regional poultry farm are at Kureepuzha.

There are two Central Government industrial operations in the city, the Indian Rare Earths, Chavara and Parvathi Mills Ltd., Kollam. Kerala Ceramics Ltd. in Kundara, Kerala Electrical and Allied Engineering Company in Kundara, Kerala Premo Pipe factory in Chavara, Kerala Minerals and Metals Limited in Chavara and United Electrical Industries in Kollam are Kerala Government-owned companies. Other major industries in the private/cooperative sector are Aluminium Industries Ltd. in Kundara, Thomas Stephen & Co. in Kollam, Floorco in Paravur and Cooperative Spinning Mill in Chathannoor. The beach sands of the district have concentrations of such heavy minerals as Ilmenite, Rutile, Monosite and Zircon, which offer scope for exploitation for industrial purposes.

Besides large deposits of China clay in Kundara, Mulavana and Chathannoor, there are also lime-shell deposits in Ashtamudi Lake and Bauxite deposits in Adichanallur.

Known as the "Cashew Capital of the World", Kollam is noted for its traditional cashew business and is home to more than 600 cashew-processing units. Every year, about 800,000 tonnes of raw cashews are imported into the city for processing and an average of 130,000 tonnes of processed cashews are exported to various countries worldwide. The Cashew Export Promotion Council of India (CEPCI) expects a rise in exports to 275,000 tonnes by 2020, an increase of 120 per cent over the current figure. The Kerala State Cashew Development Corporation Limited (KSCDC) is situated at Mundakkal in Kollam city. The company owns 30 cashew factories all across Kerala. Of these, 24 are located in Kollam district.

Kollam is one of many seafood export hubs in India with numerous companies involved in the sector. Most of these are based in the Maruthadi, Sakthikulangara, Kavanad, Neendakara, Asramam, Kilikollur, Thirumullavaram and Uliyakovil areas of the city. Kollam - Marine Food Exporters Capithans, Kings Marine Exporters, India Food Exports and Oceanic Fisheries are examples of seafood exporters.

Kollam's Ashtamudi Lake clam fishery was the first Marine Stewardship Council (MSC) certified fishery in India. The clam fishery supports around 3,000 people involved in the collection, cleaning, processing and trading of clams. Around 90 species of fish and ten species of clams are found in the lake.

Culture
Kollam Fest is Kollam's own annual festival, attracting mostly Keralites but also hundreds of domestic and foreign tourists to Kollam. The main venue of Kollam Fest is the historic and gigantic Ashramam Maidan. Kollam Fest is the signature event of Kollam. Kollam Fest seeks to showcase Kollam's rich culture and heritage, tourism potential and investments in new ventures.

Kollam Pooram, part of the Asramam Sree Krishna Swamy Temple Festival, is usually held on 15 April, but occasionally on 16 April. The pooram is held at the Ashramam maidan.

The President's Trophy Boat Race (PTBR) is an annual regatta held in Ashtamudi Lake in Kollam. The event was inaugurated by President Prathibha Patil in September 2011. The event has been rescheduled from 2012.

Transport

Air

The city corporation of Kollam is served by the Trivandrum International Airport, which is about 56 kilometers from the city via NH66 . Trivandrum International Airport is the first international airport in a non-metro city in India.

Rail

 is the second largest railway station in Kerala in area, after Shoranur Junction, with a total of 6 platforms. The station has 17 rail tracks. Kollam junction has world's third longest railway platform, measuring 1180.5 m(3873 ft).
Mainline Electrical Multiple Unit (MEMU) have a maintenance shed at Kollam Junction. The MEMU services started from Kollam to Ernakulam via Alappuzha and Kottayam in the second week of January 2012. By 1 December 2012, MEMU service between Kollam and Nagercoil became a reality and later extended up to Kanyakumari. Kollam MEMU Shed inaugurated on 1 December 2013 for the maintenance works of MEMU rakes. Kollam MEMU Shed is the largest MEMU Shed in Kerala, which is equipped with most modern facilities. There is a long-standing demand for the Kollam Town Railway Station in the Kollam-Perinad stretch and "S.N College Railway Station" in the Kollam-Eravipuram stretch. The railway stations in Kollam city are Kollam Junction railway station, Eravipuram railway station and Kilikollur railway station.

A new suburban rail system has been proposed by the Kerala Government and Indian Railways on the route Thiruvananthapuram - Kollam - Haripad/Chengannur for which MRVC is tasked to conduct a study and submit a report. Ten trains, each with seven coaches, will transport passengers back and forth along the Trivandrum-Kollam-Chengannur-Kottarakara-Adoor section.

Road
The city of Kollam is connected to almost all the cities and major towns in the state, including Trivandrum, Alappuzha, Kochi, Palakkad, Kottayam, Kottarakkara, and Punalur, and with other Indian cities through the NH 66, NH 183, NH 744 - and other state PWD Roads. Road transport is provided by state-owned Kerala State Road Transport Corporation (KSRTC) and private transport bus operators. Kollam is one among the five KSRTC zones in Kerala. Road transport is also provided by private taxis and autorickshaws, also called autos. There is a city private bus stand at Andamukkam. There is a KSRTC bus station beside Ashtamudi Lake. Buses to various towns in Kerala and interstate services run from this station.

Water

The State Water Transport Department operates boat services to West Kallada, Munroe Island, Guhanandapuram, Dalavapuram and Alappuzha from Kollam KSWTD Ferry Terminal situated on the banks of the Ashtamudi Lake. Asramam Link Road in the city passes adjacent to the ferry terminal.

Double decker luxury boats run between Kollam and Allepey daily. Luxury boats, operated by the government and private owners, operate from the main boat jetty during the tourist season. The West coast canal system, which starts from Thiruvananthapuram in the south and ends at Hosdurg in the north, passes through Paravur, the city of Kollam and Karunagappally taluk.

Kollam Port is the second largest port in Kerala, after Cochin Port Trust. It is one of two international ports in Kerala. Cargo handling facilities began operation in 2013. Foreign ships arrive in the port regularly with the MV Alina, a  vessel registered in Antigua anchored at the port on 4April 2014. Once the Port starts functioning in full-fledged, it will make the transportation activities of Kollam-based cashew companies more easy. Shreyas Shipping Company is now running a regular container service between Kollam Port and Kochi Port.Shreyas Shipping inaugurates Kollam port with new service. Accessed 29 July 2014.

Education

There are many respected colleges, schools and learning centres in Kollam. The city and suburbs contribute greatly to education by providing the best and latest knowledge to the scholars. The Government of Kerala has granted academic autonomy to Fatima Mata National College, another prestigious institution in the city. Sree Narayana College, Bishop Jerome Institute (an integrated campus providing Architecture, Engineering and Management courses), and Travancore Business Academy are other important colleges in the city. There are two law colleges in the city, Sree Narayana Guru College of Legal Studies under the control of Sree Narayana Trust and N S S Law College managed by the N.S.S. There are also some best schools in Kollam including Trinity Lyceum School, Infant Jesus School, St Aloysius H.S.S, The oxford school, Sri Sri Academy etc.

Kerala State Institute of Design (KSID), a design institute under Department of labour and Skills, Government of Kerala, is located at Chandanathope in Kollam. It was established in 2008 and was one of the first state-owned design institutes in India. KSID currently conducts Post Graduate Diploma Programs in Design developed in association with National Institute of Design, Ahmedabad.

Indian Institute of Infrastructure and Construction (IIIC-Kollam) is an institute of international standards situated at Chavara in Kollam city to support the skill development programmes for construction related occupations. The Institute of Fashion Technology, Kollam, Kerala is a fashion technology institute situated at Vellimon, established in technical collaboration with the National Institute of Fashion Technology and the Ministry of Textiles. In addition, there are two IMK (Institute of Management, Kerala) Extension Centres active in the city. Kerala Maritime Institute is situated at Neendakara in Kollam city to give maritime training for the students in Kerala. More than 5,000 students have been trained at Neendakara maritime institute under the Boat Crew training programme.

Apart from colleges, there are a number of bank coaching centres in Kollam. Kollam is known as India's hub for bank test coaching centres with around 40 such institutes in the district. Students from various Indian states such as Tamil Nadu, Karnataka, Andhra Pradesh, Bihar and Madhya Pradesh also come here for coaching.

Sports

Cricket is the most popular sport, followed by hockey and football. Kollam is home to a number of local cricket, hockey and football teams participating in district, state-level and zone matches. An International Hockey Stadium with astro-turf facility is there at Asramam in the city, built at a cost of Rs. 13 crore. The land for the construction of the stadium was taken over from the Postal Department at Asramam, Kollam. The city has another stadium named the Lal Bahadur Shastri Stadium, Kollam. It is a multipurpose stadium and has repeatedly hosted such sports events as the Ranji Trophy, Santhosh Trophy and National Games. Two open grounds in the city, the Asramam Maidan and Peeranki Maidan, are also used for sports events, practice and warm-up matches.

 Tourist places 

Places of worship
Hindus and temples

Anandavalleeshwaram Sri Mahadevar Temple is a 400 years old ancient Hindu temple in the city. The 400-year-old Sanctum sanctorum of this temple is finished in teak. Ammachiveedu Muhurthi temple is another major temple in the city that have been founded around 600 years ago by the Ammachi Veedu family, aristocrats from Kollam.Ammachiveedu Muhurthi Temple at thekeralatemples.com The Kollam pooram, a major festival of Kollam, is the culmination of a ten-day festival, normally in mid April, of Asramam Sree Krishna Swamy Temple. Kottankulangara Devi Temple is one of the world-famous Hindu temples in Kerala were cross-dressing of men for Chamayavilakku'' ritual is a part of traditional festivities. The men also carry large lamps. The first of the two-day dressing event drew to a close early on Monday. Moreover, Kottarakkara Sree Mahaganapathi Kshethram in Kottarakkara, Puttingal Devi Temple in Paravur, sooranad north anayadi Pazhayidam Sree Narasimha Swami Temple Poruvazhy Peruviruthy Malanada Temple in Poruvazhy, Sasthamcotta Sree Dharma Sastha Temple in Sasthamkotta, Sakthikulangara Sree Dharma Sastha temple, Thrikkadavoor Sree Mahadeva Temple in Kadavoor and Kattil Mekkathil Devi Temple in Ponmana Padanayarkulangara mahadeva temple Karunagappally, Ashtamudi Sree Veerabhadra Swamy Temple are the other famous Hindu worship centres in the Kollam Metropolitan Area.

Christianity and churches

The Infant Jesus Cathedral in Tangasseri is established by Portuguese during 1614. It is now the pro-cathedral of Roman Catholic Diocese of Quilon – the ancient and first Catholic diocese of India. The church remains as a memento of the Portuguese rule of old Quilon city. St. Sebastian's Church at Neendakara is another important church in the city. The Dutch Church in Munroe Island is built by the Dutch in 1878. Our Lady of Velankanni Shrine in Cutchery is another important Christian worship place in Kollam city. Saint Casimir Church in Kadavoor, Holy Family Church in Kavanad, St.Stephen's Church in Thoppu and St.Thomas Church in Kadappakada are some of the other major Christian churches in Kollam.Muslims and mosques'''
Kottukadu Juma Masjid in Chavara, Elampalloor Juma-A-Masjid, Valiyapalli in Jonakappuram, Chinnakada Juma Masjid, Juma-'Ath Palli in Kollurvila, Juma-'Ath Palli in Thattamala and Koivila Juma Masjid in Chavara are the other major Mosques in Kollam.

Notable people

Notable individuals born in Kollam include:

 Mahakavi K.C Kesava Pillai, Malayalam poet
 C. Kesavan, Chief Minister of erstwhile Travancore
 Elamkulam Kunjan Pillai, historian and scholar
 R. Sankar, former Chief Minister of Kerala
 A. A. Rahim, Former Union minister
J. Mercykutty Amma, Politician
 Paravur Devarajan, Malayalam music director
 Thirunalloor Karunakaran, poet
 O. N. V. Kurup, Malayalam poet and lyricist
 K. Balakrishnan, Writer, politician, journalist
 K. Surendran, Novelist
 V. Sambasivan, Kathaprasangam artist
 O. Madhavan, theatre personality
 Shaji N Karun, Malayalam movie director
 Murali, Malayalam movie actor
 Thangal Kunju Musaliar, industrialist & educational visionary
 Kollam Thulasi, actor
 Kollam G. K. Pillai, actor
 Jayan, a film actor and Indian Navy officer
 P. K. Gurudasan, politician and MLA
 James Albert, screenwriter and director
 Suresh Gopi, actor
 Pamman (R. Parameswara Menon), novelist
 Mukesh, Malayalam film actor
 Resul Pookutty, Oscar Award winner, sound engineer
 Kalpana, actress
 Urvashi, actress
 Kalaranjini, actress
 Tinu Yohannan, international cricket
 Olympian T. C. Yohannan, athlete
 Ambili Devi, Malayalam film actress
 Rajan Pillai, businessman
 B. Ravi Pillai, businessman
 Kundara Johnny, film actor
 K. Ravindran Nair (Achani Ravi), film producer
 M. A. Baby, politician
 Baby John, politician
 Matha Amrithananda Mayi, spiritual leader
 Sooraj Surendran, electronic engineer
 R. Gopakumar, visual artist, India's first major digital art collector

See also
 Downtown Kollam
 Kollam Junction railway station
 Kollam Metropolitan Area
 Kollam District
 Cashew business in Kollam

References

Bibliography
 
 
 
 Elamkulam Kunjan Pillai, Keralathinde Eruladanja Edukal, p. 64,112,117
 Travancore Archaeological Series (T.A.S.) Vol. 6 p. 15
 Diaries and writings of Mathai Kathanar, the 24th generation priest of Thulaserry Manapurathu, based on the ancestral documents and Thaliyolagrandha handed down through generations
 Z.M. Paret, Malankara Nazranikal, vol. 1
 L. K. Ananthakrishna Iyer, State Manual, p50,52
 Bernard Thoma Kathanar, Marthoma Christyanikal, lines 23,24
 
 Narayan, M.G.S, Chera-Pandya conflict in the 8th–9th centuries which led to the birth of Venad: Pandyan History seminar, Madurai University, 1971
 The Viswavijnanakosam (Malayalam) Vol. 3, p. 523,534
 Narayan M.G.S., Cultural Symbiosis p33
 The handwritten diaries of Pulikottil Mar Dionyius (former supreme head of the Malankara Orthodox Syrian Church and Chitramezhuthu KM Varghese)

External links

 
 

 
Metropolitan cities in India
History of Kollam
Former Portuguese colonies
Cities and towns in Kollam district
Tourism in Kerala
Former capital cities in India
Populated coastal places in India
Port cities in India